During the Sri Lankan Civil War militant groups, paramilitary groups and government security forces were accused of assassinating many public figures on suspicion of being sympathizers or informants, in retaliation for killings and attacks, to eliminate competition from rival groups, or to stifle dissent. The following is a list of notable assassinations of the Sri Lankan Civil War, attributed by various self-admissions, NGOs, United Nations agencies, foreign governments, and the state-owned media of Sri Lanka

Background
The Sri Lankan Civil War was in a conflict on the island-nation of Sri Lanka. Between 1983 and 2009 there was an intermittent civil war, predominantly between the government and the Liberation Tigers of Tamil Eelam (LTTE), a separatist militant organisation who during this time fought for the creation of an independent state named Tamil Eelam in the North and East of the island. The UN has estimated that up to 100,000 people (combatants and civilians) may have been killed during the 26 years of fighting. The civil war has caused significant harm to the population and economy of the country, as well as leading to the ban of the LTTE as a terrorist organisation in 32 countries including the United States, Australia, the countries of the European Union and Canada. The war ended in May 2009 when the Sri Lankan military defeated the LTTE. Numerous human rights violations have been committed by both the Sri Lankan military and the LTTE, including the assassination of individuals by both sides. A majority of the notable figures on this list were members of the Tamil community in Sri Lanka, and in many instances were allegedly assassinated by the LTTE for taking moderate political stances, or for rejecting militant action and attempting to engage in the democratic process in Sri Lanka.

Assassinations

Heads of state and government

Ministers

Members of Sri Lankan parliament

Provincial councillors

Local councillors

Other politicians

Military officers

Police officers

Civil servants

Journalists

Academics

Religious figures

Militants

Others

Attempted assassinations

Heads of state and government

Ministers

Public officials

Military officers

Diplomats

See also
 List of assassinations of the Second JVP Insurrection
 List of attacks attributed to the LTTE
 List of attacks attributed to the Sri Lankan military
 List of people assassinated by the Liberation Tigers of Tamil Eelam

References

 
Assassinations of the Sri Lankan Civil war
Assassinations of the Sri Lankan Civil war
Sri Lankan Civil War, Notable assassinations of the
Sri Lankan Civil War, Notable Attempted assassinations of the
Assassinations of the Sri Lankan Civil war
Sri Lankan Civil War-related lists
Sri Lankan Civil War casualties
Assassinations of the Civil War